Hessy Levinsons Taft (born Hessy Levinsons), a German Jew, was featured as an infant in Nazi propaganda after her photo won a contest to find "the most beautiful Aryan baby" in 1935. Taft's image was subsequently distributed widely by the Nazi party in a variety of materials, such as magazines and postcards, to promote Aryanism.

Photograph
Taft's Ashkenazi Jewish parents, Jacob Levinsons and Pauline Levinsons (née Levine), were originally from Latvia and were unaware of their photographer's decision to enter the photograph into the contest until learning that the photo of their daughter had been selected by Nazi Propaganda Minister Joseph Goebbels as the winner.

Fearing that the Nazis would discover that their family was Jewish, Taft's mother informed the photographer that they were Jewish. The photographer told her mother, Pauline, that he knew they were Jewish and deliberately entered Taft's photograph into the contest because he "wanted to make the Nazis ridiculous". In July 2014 Taft told the German-language newspaper Bild that "I can laugh about it now, but if the Nazis had known who I really was, I wouldn't be alive."

Later life
In 1938, Jacob Levinsons was briefly arrested by the SS. In the same year, the family immigrated to France and settled in Paris, then later moved to Cuba and from there to the United States in 1949.

Hessy Levinsons studied chemistry at Julia Richman High School in New York, and majored in chemistry at Barnard College, graduating in 1955.
As a graduate student in chemistry at Columbia University she met her husband, mathematics instructor Earl Taft. She and her husband joined the faculty at Rutgers University, but she left academia to raise a family, later working on the AP Chemistry exam for the Educational Testing Service.
After 30 years at the Educational Testing Service, she returned to New York as a chemistry professor at St. John's University in 2000. Her research in this later period of life focused on water sustainability. She retired in 2016.

See also
 Werner Goldberg – soldier with partial Jewish ancestry also used in Nazi propaganda

References

1934 births
Living people
Nazi propaganda
Child models
Jewish American scientists
Women chemists
Barnard College alumni
Columbia Graduate School of Arts and Sciences alumni
Rutgers University faculty
St. John's University (New York City) faculty
Jewish emigrants from Nazi Germany to the United States
People notable for being the subject of a specific photograph
Julia Richman Education Complex alumni